Nick Jr. is a cable television channel in Latin America owned by Paramount Global subsidiary Paramount Networks Americas. The channel is aimed at a preschool audience.

Currently, the Nick Jr. channel features the same programming as the Nick Jr. block on Nickelodeon, as well as some shows previously seen on the block, such as Team Umizoomi and Bubble Guppies.

History 
The block was first introduced in the fall 1990s and early 2000s as a programming block airing on Nickelodeon’s Latin American channel, on July 1, 2008, Nick Jr. was launched as a channel in the region.

In 2010, Nick Jr. Latin America changed to its current logo.

Programming

Current programming 
 Alvinnn!!! and the Chipmunks (since 2016)
 Anna and Friends (since 2022)
 Baby Shark's Big Show! (since 2021)
 Blaze and the Monster Machines (since 2015)
 Blue's Clues & You! (since 2020)
 Bubble Guppies (since 2011)
 Butterbean's Café (since 2019)
 Care Bears: Unlock the Magic (since 2020)
 Corn & Peg (since 2019)
 Deer Squad (since 2021)
 Dora the Explorer (since 2008)
 Dora and Friends: Into the City! (since 2015)
 Garden Academy (since 2020)
 Go, Diego! Go! (since 2008)
 PAW Patrol (since 2013)
 Rainbow Rangers (since 2019)
 Rusty Rivets (since 2017)
 Rugrats (since 2022)
 Santiago of the Seas  (since 2021)
 The Adventures of Paddington (since 2020)
 Top Wing (since 2018)
 Zumbar (since 2021)

Former programming 
 Abby Hatcher (2019-2022)
 Allegra's Window
 Bananas in Pyjamas
 Barbapapa: One Big Happy Family! (2021)
 Becca's Bunch (2018-2019)
 Ben and Holly's Little Kingdom
 Blue's Clues (2008–2016)
 Blue's Room
 Castelo Rá-Tim-Bum 
 Digby Dragon
 Doggy Day School
 Dougie in Disguise
 Eureeka's Castle
 Fresh Beat Band of Spies (2016-2018)
 Fifi and the Flowertots
 Gullah Gullah Island
 Kid-E-Cats (2018-2022)
 Kiva Can Do!
 Little Charmers (2016-2018)
 Little Bear
 Little Bill
 Littlest Pet Shop (2013-2018)
 Louie
 Max & Ruby
 Mutt & Stuff 
 Nella the Princess Knight (2017–2020)
 Ni Hao, Kai-Lan
 Olive the Ostrich
 Os Chocolix
 Peter Rabbit 
 Regal Academy
 Roary the Racing Car
 Rupert Bear
 School of Roars (2020-2022)
 Shimmer and Shine (2016-2020) 
 Sunny Day (2017–2020)
 Taina and the Amazon's Guardians (2020)
 Team Umizoomi (2010–2018)
 The Beatbuds, Let's Jam! (2021)
 The Busy World of Richard Scarry
 The Day Henry Met?
 The Wubbulous World of Dr. Seuss
 Tickety Toc
 Trulli Tales (2019-2020)
 Wanda and the Alien
 Wonder Pets!
 Zoofari

External links
 Official website (in Spanish)
 Brazilian official website (in Portuguese)

Latin America
Television channels and stations established in 2008
Spanish-language television stations
2008 establishments in South America